David Sutherland  (4 March 1933 – 19 January 2023) was a Scottish illustrator and comics artist with DC Thomson, responsible for The Bash Street Kids (1962–2023), Dennis the Menace (1970–1998), Fred's Bed (2008–2012) for The Beano, and the second version of Jak for The Dandy in the early 2000s.

Sutherland started out as an adventure strip artist, drawing strips such as The Beano'''s The Great Flood of London in 1960–61 (reprinted in Classics from the Comics in 2007) and Billy the Cat (see), before replacing Leo Baxendale as the artist for The Bash Street Kids, who were given the two pages in the centre of the comic at the same time. He was the strip's main artist since then, during which time he had drawn more than 2000 individual strips for the weekly comic. He also replaced Dudley D. Watkins on Biffo the Bear after his death in 1969, and continued to draw the character through the 1970s, after his strip relinquished that cover of the comic to Dennis in 1974.

In 1977, Gnasher was given his own strip in the Beano, Gnasher's Tale, which like the main Dennis strip was drawn by Sutherland. Similarly, when Dennis's pet pig, Rasher, received his own page in 1984, Sutherland was again the strip's artist, as he was when Gnasher's Tale was replaced by Gnasher and Gnipper in 1986. Sutherland began to draw The Germs for the comic in 1988, although in the early 1990s he was replaced by Vic Neill. He also stopped drawing Gnasher and Gnipper in 1992, with artistic duties being handed to Barry Glennard.

In 1998, Sutherland stopped drawing Dennis the Menace after 28 years, handing over to David Parkins, although he continued to draw the Bash Street Kids. Over the next few years, he drew Korky the Cat for the Dandy, as well as the second incarnation of Jak.

In 2009 it was confirmed that he was the new artist for the Beano'''s Fred's Bed strip. Initially taking over for a three-month period as replacement for Hunt Emerson, he later shared the workload with Tom Paterson before taking over as the strip's main artist during 2011.

Sutherland sometimes drew himself into strips, such as Biffo in the 2010 annual.

To mark Sutherland's 50 years as illustrator of the Bash Street Kids, an exhibition of original artwork from D C Thomson's collections was held at the University of Dundee from June to August 2012, with the artist appearing for a Q&A event on 13 June.

Sutherland was appointed Officer of the Order of the British Empire (OBE) in the 2023 New Year Honours for services to illustration.

Sutherland died on 19 January 2023, at the age of 89.

Comic strips

The strips that Sutherland drew for DC Thomson over the years include:

References

1933 births
2023 deaths
People from Ross and Cromarty
Scottish comics artists
British comic strip cartoonists
The Dandy people
The Beano people
Dennis the Menace and Gnasher
Officers of the Order of the British Empire